CityLab may refer to:

CityLab (laboratory), laboratory at the Boston University School of Medicine
CityLab (web magazine), a website created by The Atlantic now owned by Bloomberg Media

See also
Citylab-Orlando
Citilab